Tatana (Tatanaq) is a Sabahan language spoken in Sabah, Malaysia.  Due to limited studies, it is hard to ascertain whether Tatana requires a category on its own or is considered a Bisaya variety based on its 90% linguistic intelligibility with the closely related Bisaya ethnic in Sabah. The current speakers of Tatana identify themselves as an ethnic subgroup of the Dusun people of Borneo. Jason Lobel (2013:360) classifies Tatana (along with Papar) as Murutic rather than Dusunic.

References

Lobel, Jason William. 2013. Philippine and North Bornean languages: issues in description, subgrouping, and reconstruction. Ph.D. dissertation. Manoa: University of Hawai'i at Manoa.

Further reading

Murutic languages
Languages of Sabah
Languages of Malaysia